American singer Prince Royce has released six studio albums, a compilation album, one extended plays (EP), 52 singles (43 as a lead artist and 7 as a featured artist) and 57 music videos in Spanish, English, and even Portuguese.

In March 2010, Royce released his eponymous debut studio album, which generated two commercially successful singles, "Stand by Me" and "Corazón Sin Cara". In the United States, both songs reached number-one on the Billboard Tropical Songs chart, while "Corazón Sin Cara" reached number-one on the Billboard Hot Latin Songs chart. The album itself reached number-one on the US Billboard Top Latin Albums and Tropical Albums charts. Royce received three awards at the Billboard Latin Music Awards in 2011, which included Tropical Album of the Year. On April 10, 2012, Royce released his second studio album, Phase II, which reached number-one on both the US Latin Albums and Tropical Albums charts. The album featured the singles "Las Cosas Pequeñas" and "Incondicional" and was nominated for the Latin Grammy Award for Best Tropical Fusion Album.

His third studio album, Soy el Mismo, was released on October 8, 2013, preceded by the single "Darte un Beso". The album earned Royce his second nomination for the Latin Grammy Award for Best Contemporary Tropical Album. On July 24, 2015, Royce released his fourth studio album, Double Vision, his first full English-language album. The album included the singles "Stuck on a Feeling" featuring Snoop Dogg and "Back It Up" featuring Jennifer Lopez and Pitbull, with both charting on the US Billboard Hot 100.

Five was released as Royce's fifth studio album on February 24, 2017. It became Royce's fourth number-one album on the Billboard Top Latin Albums chart. The album's last single, "Déjà Vu", with Shakira, became its most successful commercially and was certified 9× Platinum (Latin) by the Recording Industry Association of America (RIAA) in the US.

Albums

Studio albums

Compilation albums

Extended plays

Singles

As lead artist

Spanish and Portuguese-language

English-language

As featured artist

Guest appearances

Music videos

Notes

References

Tropical music discographies
Discographies of American artists